Skewes is a hamlet near St Wenn in mid Cornwall, England, United Kingdom.

References

Hamlets in Cornwall